Musa Vand (also Romanized as Mūsá Vand, Mūsá Vandī, and Mūsīvand; also known as Sarab-e Mūsá Valadī and Sarab-e Mūsīvardī) is a village in Beyranvand-e Jonubi Rural District, Bayravand District, Khorramabad County, Lorestan Province, Iran. At the 2006 census, its population was 16, in 5 families.

References 

Towns and villages in Khorramabad County